Yevgeni Valeryevich Lyamtsev (born 14 February 1989) is a former Russian football player.

Club career
He played in the Russian Football National League for FC Dynamo Bryansk in 2008.

External links
 
 
 Profile by Sportbox

1989 births
Living people
Russian footballers
Association football forwards
FC Dynamo Bryansk players